The Rural Municipality of Ponass Lake No. 367 is a rural municipality (RM) in the Canadian province of Saskatchewan within Census Division No. 14 and  Division No. 4.

History 
The RM of Ponass Lake No. 367 incorporated as a rural municipality on January 1, 1913.

Geography

Communities and localities 
The following urban municipalities are surrounded by the RM.

Towns
 Rose Valley

Villages
 Fosston

The following unincorporated communities are within the RM.

Localities
 Cuvier
 Nora
 Scrip

Demographics 

Attractions 
 Nut Lake
 Rose Valley & District Heritage Museum
 Ponass Lake Heritage Marsh

Government 
The RM of Ponass Lake No. 367 is governed by an elected municipal council and an appointed administrator that meets on the second Wednesday of every month. The reeve of the RM is Allan Nelson while its administrator is Loretta Prevost. The RM's office is located in Rose Valley.

Transportation 
 Saskatchewan Highway 35
 Saskatchewan Highway 49
 Saskatchewan Highway 756
 Canadian Pacific Railway

See also 
List of rural municipalities in Saskatchewan

References 

P